Adam Freier (born 20 March 1980) is a rugby union footballer. In 2015 he came out of retirement to play Shute Shield for Randwick until this day. His usual playing position is hooker.

Playing career
Son of Sydney rugby league footballer and coach Laurie Freier born 20 March 1980, in Paddington, NSW, Australia, he made the Australian Schoolboys in 1998 as well as the under-19s, which he captained the following year. He went on to play for the Australian under-21s, including captaining them at the 2001 under-21 Rugby Championships, in which they finished runner-up to New Zealand. He made his debut for the Wallabies in 2002, in a Test against Argentina.

In 2005 he was selected for the final match of the 2005 Tri Nations Series. After he was selected as the run-on hooker in the second Cook Cup match in 2006.

Freier told the Sydney Morning Herald his reasons for approaching the Rebels included: "Mutual respect, a coach he admires, the challenge of new team." Freier was sidelined in September due to complications from a 2008 back injury. Rebels coach Rod Macqueen reported Frier to be undergoing rehabilitation. Frier wasn't fit to compete in pre-season trials against teams from Tonga and Fiji, and the Crusaders from New Zealand; he remained in doubt for the Rebels' season opener against the Waratahs.

Freier played three Rebels games for the 2011 Super Rugby season. In May 2012, he expected to play his 100th Super Rugby game. In 2019, he played one game for Randwick against Argentina.

Journalism
Freier writes about the Wallabies, Melbourne's crowded sporting landscape, and his own squad the Melbourne Rebels. Fairfax Media publishes his articles in the Sydney Morning Herald and/or the Melbourne Age.  Freier is also a regular panellist on the ABC Offsiders sports program.

Rugby Union Players Association
Freier is president of RUPA, the Rugby Union Players Association.

References

External links

1980 births
Australian rugby union players
Australia international rugby union players
ACT Brumbies players
New South Wales Waratahs players
Living people
Rugby union hookers
Melbourne Rebels players
Rugby union players from Sydney